The Bussard ramjet is a theoretical method of spacecraft propulsion proposed in 1960 by the physicist Robert W. Bussard, popularized by Poul Anderson's novel Tau Zero, Larry Niven in his Known Space series of books, Vernor Vinge in his Zones of Thought series, and referred to by Carl Sagan in the television series and book Cosmos.

Bussard proposed a ramjet variant of a fusion rocket capable of reasonable interstellar travel, using enormous electromagnetic fields (ranging from kilometers to many thousands of kilometers in diameter) as a ram scoop to collect and compress hydrogen from the interstellar medium. High speeds force the reactive mass into a progressively constricted magnetic field, compressing it until thermonuclear fusion occurs. The magnetic field then directs the energy into rocket exhaust, providing thrust.

Feasibility
Since the time of Bussard's original proposal, it has been discovered that the region surrounding the Solar System has a much lower density of hydrogen than was believed at that time (see Local Interstellar Cloud). John Ford Fishback made an important contribution to the details for the Bussard ramjet in 1969. T. A. Heppenheimer analyzed Bussard's original suggestion of fusing protons, but found the Bremsstrahlung losses from compressing protons to fusion densities was greater than the power that could be produced by a factor of about 1 billion, thus indicating that the proposed version of the Bussard ramjet was infeasible. However, Daniel P. Whitmire's 1975 analysis indicates that a ramjet may achieve net power via the CNO cycle, which produces fusion at a much higher rate (~1016 times higher) than the proton–proton chain.

Robert Zubrin and Dana Andrews analyzed one hypothetical version of the Bussard ramscoop and ramjet design in 1985. They determined that their version of the ramjet would be unable to accelerate into the solar wind. However, in their calculations they assumed that:

 The exhaust velocity of their interplanetary ion propulsion ramjet could not exceed 100,000 m/s (100 km/s);
 The largest available energy source could be a 500 kilowatt nuclear fusion reactor.

In the Zubrin/Andrews interplanetary ramjet design, they calculated that the drag force d/dt(mv1) equals the mass of the scooped ions collected per second multiplied by the velocity of the scooped ions within the solar system relative to the ramscoop. The velocity of the (scooped) collected ions from the solar wind was assumed to be 500,000 m/s.

The exhaust velocity of the ions when expelled by the ramjet was assumed not to exceed 100,000 m/s. The thrust of the ramjet d/dt(mv2) was equal to the mass of ions expelled per second multiplied by 100,000 meters per second. In the Zubrin/Andrews design of 1985, this resulted in the condition that d/dt(mv1) > d/dt(mv2). This condition resulted in the drag force exceeding the thrust of the hypothetical ramjet in the Zubrin/Andrews version of the design.

Related inventions

Ram Augmented Interstellar Rocket (RAIR)
The problem of using the interstellar medium as the sole fuel source led to study of the Ram Augmented Interstellar Rocket (RAIR). The RAIR carries its nuclear fuel supply and exhausts the reaction products to produce some of its thrust. However it greatly enhances its performance by scooping the interstellar medium and  using this as extra reaction mass to augment the rocket. The propulsion system of the RAIR consists of three subsystems: a fusion reactor, a scoop field, and a plasma accelerator. The scoop field funnels interstellar gas into an "accelerator" (this could for example be a heat exchange system transferring thermal energy from the reactor directly to the interstellar gas) which is supplied power from a reactor. One of the best ways to understand this concept is to consider that the hydrogen nuclear fuel carried on board acts as a fuel (energy source) whereas the interstellar gas collected by the scoop and then exhausted at great speed from the back acts as a propellant (the reaction mass), the vehicle therefore has a limited fuel supply but an unlimited propellant supply. A normal Bussard ramjet would have an infinite supply of both. However, theory suggests that where a Bussard ramjet would suffer drag from having to pre-accelerate interstellar gas to its own speed before intake, a RAIR system would be able to transfer energy via the "accelerator" mechanism to the interstellar medium despite velocity differences, and so would suffer far less drag.

Laser Powered Interstellar Ramjet
Beamed energy coupled with a vehicle scooping hydrogen from the interstellar medium is another variant. A laser array in the solar system beams to a collector on a vehicle which uses something like a linear accelerator to produce thrust. This solves the fusion reactor problem for the ramjet. There are limitations because of the attenuation of beamed energy with distance.

Magnetic sail
The calculations (by Robert Zubrin and an associate) inspired the idea of a magnetic parachute or sail. This could be important for interstellar travel because it means that deceleration at the destination can be performed with a magnetic parachute rather than a rocket.

Dyson swarm-based stellar engine (Caplan thruster)

Astrophysicist Matthew E. Caplan of Illinois State University has proposed a type of stellar engine that uses a Dyson swarm of mirrors to concentrate  stellar energy onto certain regions of a Sun-like star, producing beams of solar wind to be collected by a multi-ramjet assembly which in turn produces directed jets of plasma to stabilize its orbit and oxygen-14 to push the star. Using rudimentary calculations that assume maximum efficiency, Caplan estimates the Bussard engine would use 1015 grams per second of solar material to produce a maximum acceleration of 10−9 m/s2, yielding a velocity of 200 km/s after 5 million years, and a distance of 10 parsecs over 1 million years. The Bussard engine would theoretically work for 100 million years given the mass loss rate of the Sun, but Caplan deems 10 million years to be sufficient for a stellar collision avoidance. His  proposal was commissioned by the educational YouTube channel Kurzgesagt.

Pre-seeded trajectory
Several of the obvious technical difficulties with the Bussard ramjet can be overcome by prelaunching fuel along the spacecraft's trajectory using something like a magnetic rail-gun.

The advantages of this system include
 Launching only ionized fusion fuel so that either magnetic or electrostatic scoops can more easily funnel the fuel into the engine.  The drawback is this will cause the fuel to disperse due to electrostatic repulsion.
 Launching the fuel on a trajectory so that the fuel velocity vector will closely match the expected velocity vector of the spacecraft at that point in its trajectory.  This will minimize the "drag" forces generated by the collection of fuel.
 Launching optimized isotope ratios for the fusion engines on the spacecraft.  A conventional Bussard ramjet will mostly collect hydrogen with an atomic weight of 1.  This isotope is harder to fuse than either the deuterium or tritium isotopes of hydrogen.  By launching the ideal ratio of hydrogen isotopes for the fusion engine in the spacecraft one can optimize the performance of the fusion engine.
 Although the prelaunched fuel for the ramjet negates one advantage of the Bussard design (collection of fuel as it moves through the interstellar medium, saving the cost to launch the fuel mass), it at least retains the advantage of not having to accelerate the mass of the fuel and the mass of the rocket at the same time.
 The prelaunched fuel would provide some visibility into the interstellar medium – thus alerting the trailing spacecraft of unseen hazards (e.g. brown dwarfs).

The major disadvantages of this system include
 The spacecraft could not deviate from the precalculated trajectory unless it was critical to do so.  Any such deviation would separate the spacecraft from its fuel supply and leave it with only a minimal ability to return to its original trajectory.
 Prelaunched fuel for deceleration at the destination star would not be available unless launched many decades in advance of the spacecraft launch.  However, other systems (such as the magnetic sails) could be used for this purpose.

References

 For more on ramjet math calculations see

External links
Interstellar Medium
Interstellar Hydrogen
Images of Bussard Ramjet

Hypothetical spacecraft
Interstellar travel
Nuclear spacecraft propulsion
Hydrogen technologies
Hypothetical technology
1960 in science